Stigmella torminalis is a moth of the family Nepticulidae. It is only known from one locality in Great Britain and two records in Germany.

The wingspan is 4–5 mm.

The larvae feed on Sorbus torminalis. They mine the leaves of their host plant. The mine consists of a straight, narrow corridor, gradually becoming wider and more contorted, in the end almost forming a botch. The frass is dispersed linearly throughout. Pupation takes place outside of the mine.

References

External links
Fauna Europaea
bladmineerders.nl

Nepticulidae
Moths of Europe
Moths described in 1890